Ape Uprising! is the seventh studio album released by American heavy metal band Slough Feg (formerly The Lord Weird Slough Feg). A vinyl edition was released in 2009 by Iron Kodex Records.  666 copies were pressed, the first 150 on brown/yellow/orange haze vinyl.

Track listing

References

External links 
 Album entry at Encyclopaedia Metallum
 Band website

2009 albums
Slough Feg albums
Science fiction albums